The 8th National People's Congress was in session from 1993 to 1998. It succeeded the 7th National People's Congress. It held five sessions in this period.

Election results

Elected state leaders
In the 1st Session in 1993, the Congress elected the state leaders:
President of the People's Republic of China: Jiang Zemin
Chairman of the Standing Committee of the National People's Congress: Qiao Shi
Premier of the State Council: Li Peng
Chairman of the Central Military Commission: Jiang Zemin
President of the Supreme People's Court: Ren Jianxin
Procurator-General of the Supreme People's Procuratorate: Zhang Siqing

Congressional results

|-
! style="background-color:#E9E9E9;text-align:left;vertical-align:top;" |Parties
!style="background-color:#E9E9E9"|Seats
|-
| style="text-align:left;" |
Chinese Communist Party (中国共产党)
Revolutionary Committee of the Kuomintang (民革
China Democratic League (民盟)
China Democratic National Construction Association (民建)
China Association for Promoting Democracy (民进)
Chinese Peasants' and Workers' Democratic Party (农工民主党)
Zhigongdang of China (中国致公党)
Jiusan Society (九三学社)
Taiwan Democratic Self-Government League (台盟)
Non-partisans
| style="vertical-align:top;" |2,978
|-
|style="text-align:left;background-color:#E9E9E9"|Total
|width="30" style="text-align:right;background-color:#E9E9E9"|2,978
|}

External links
 Official website of the NPC

1993 in China
National People's Congresses